is a city located in Yamaguchi Prefecture, Japan. As of April 2022, the city has an estimated population of 58,978 and a population density of 470 persons per km2. The total area is 132.99 km2.

The modern city of San'yō-Onoda was established on March 22, 2005, from the merger of the city of Onoda, with the town of San'yō (from Asa District).

San'yō-Onoda is between Ube and Asa, and is largely an industrial town. It has a beach area called Kirara Beach, a manmade beach that has a few restaurants and a glass-making factory.

Education

Public University
San'yō-Onoda City University (formerly the Tokyo University of Science, Yamaguchi)

Sister cities
  Chichibu, Saitama, Japan since May 20, 1996
  Moreton Bay, Australia since August 18, 1992

Notable people from San'yō-Onoda
Yohei Kurakawa, Japanese football player
Aoki Shūzō, former Foreign Minister in Meiji period Japan
Minoru Fujita, Japanese professional wrestler

References

External links

 San'yō-Onoda official website 
 San'yō-Onoda official website 

Cities in Yamaguchi Prefecture
Port settlements in Japan
Populated coastal places in Japan